"If We Ever Broke Up" is a song by British singer and songwriter Mae Stephens, released on 1 January 2023 through EMI Records. It is her breakthrough single, going viral on TikTok and then reaching the top 20 in the UK Singles Chart, as well as charting in other countries.

The song's official lyric video was released in February 2023. The Official Charts Company described the song as a "quirky, funk-propelled pop song" with influences from Lily Allen and Kate Nash.

Charts

References

2023 songs
2023 singles
EMI Records singles